Luciano Guerzoni (1 April 1938 – 1 December 2020) was an Italian politician.

Career
He served three terms in the Chamber of Deputies, representing Parma for his first two terms from 1983 to 1992, and Mirandola in his final term from 1994 to 1996. He was a full professor of law at the University of Modena.

References

1938 births
2020 deaths
Politicians from Naples
Italian Communist Party politicians
Democratic Party of the Left politicians
Democrats of the Left politicians
Deputies of Legislature IX of Italy
Deputies of Legislature X of Italy
Deputies of Legislature XII of Italy
Academic staff of the University of Modena and Reggio Emilia